Meridian Entertainment Group. (MEG) is a live music entertainment company that promotes and
produces live concert events throughout different locations across America. The company also
provides support for such events that includes, talent buying expertise and consultation,
extensive marketing experience, advance and on-site production support, sponsorship
connections, and overall event related guidance.

History 
Meridian Entertainment Group ceased business in December 2017, and transitioned into Meridian Entertainment Inc (MEI).

Clients

Venue List 

 

Common Ground Music Festival (Lansing, MI) 
Cavendish Beach Music Festival (Prince Edward Island, Canada) 
Legendary Buffalo Chip Campground (Sturgis, SD) 
National Cherry Festival (Traverse City, MI) 
On the Waterfront Festival (Rockford, IL) 
Rock the Rapids (Grand Rapids, MI) 
Charlottetown Summerfest (Prince Edward Island, Canada)

Artist List

References

External links 
 www.meridianentertainmentinc.com

Entertainment companies of the United States
Companies based in Lansing, Michigan